
Year 425 (CDXXV) was a common year starting on Thursday (link will display the full calendar) of the Julian calendar. At the time, it was known as the Year of the Consulship of Theodosius and Valentinianus (or, less frequently, year 1178 Ab urbe condita). The denomination 425 for this year has been used since the early medieval period, when the Anno Domini calendar era became the prevalent method in Europe for naming years.

Events 
 By place 

 Roman Empire 
 Summer – Joannes, Roman usurper, is defeated at the fortified city of Ravenna and brought to Aquileia. After a humiliating parade on a donkey and the insults of the populace, he is executed.
 October 23 – Valentinian III, six-year-old son of Galla Placidia, is installed as emperor (Augustus) of the Western Roman Empire. Real power is in the hands of his mother who becomes a regent.
 Flavius Aetius leads a force of Huns (60,000 men) into Northern Italy. He reaches a compromise with Placidia, in return for obtaining the rank commander-in-chief (magister militum) in Gaul. 
 The Huns advance unopposed on Constantinople, but are halted by a plague that decimates their hordes (see 433).

 israel 

 The Sanhedrin is disbanded by the Roman Empire.

 By topic 

 Arts and Sciences 
 Last known usage of Demotic script in Egypt.
 c. 425–426 – Mausoleum of Galla Placidia is built.

 Education 
 February 27 – The University of Constantinople is founded by emperor Theodosius II at the urging of his wife Aelia Eudocia.

 Religion 
 Buddhism begins to spread to Southeast Asia.

Births 
 Iamblichus, Syrian philosopher
 Zeno, Byzantine Emperor (approximate date)

Deaths 
 November 5 – Atticus, archbishop of Constantinople
 Gamliel VI, last Nasi (head of the Sanhedrin)
 Helian Bobo, emperor of the Chinese Xiongnu state Xia (born 381)
 Joannes, Roman usurper 
 Mavia, Arab warrior-queen
 Sulpicius Severus, Christian writer (approximate date)
 Yax Nuun Ayiin I 15th Ajaw of Tikal (approximate date)

References